Anthidium weyrauchi is a species of bee in the family Megachilidae, the leaf-cutter, carder, or mason bees.

Distribution
Peru

References

weyrauchi
Insects described in 1943